Elijah Clark State Park is a  Georgia state park located in Lincolnton, on the western shore of Lake Strom Thurmond. The park is named for Elijah Clarke, a frontiersman and war hero who led a force of pioneers in Georgia during the American Revolution. A reconstructed log cabin displays colonial life with furniture and tools dating back to 1780. The park is also the site of the graves of Clark and his wife, Hannah. The park's location on the lake makes it popular with fishermen.

Facilities
160 tent/trailer/RV campsites
20 Cottages
10 Walk-In Campsites
2 Group Shelters
Beach
Nature trail
4 Picnic Shelters
1 Pioneer Campground
20 lake-front cottages
Miniature golf course
Children's playground

Annual events
Arts & Crafts Festival (Memorial Day weekend)
Bluegrass Festival (May)
Old Timer's Festival (October)

References

External links

Georgia State Parks

State parks of Georgia (U.S. state)
Protected areas of Lincoln County, Georgia